Hertel or Oakman-Hertel was an American veteran automobile company in Greenfield, Massachusetts started in 1899 and closing in 1900.

History 
Max Hertel was an engineer for the American Biscuit Company and entered the 1895 Chicago Times-Herald Race. His small two-cylinder gasoline car, built between two bicycle frames, broke the steering gear on the way to the starting line and he could not compete.

In 1899 Hertel established the Oakman Motor Vehicle Company in Greenfield, Massachusetts. The company produced a two-seat, two-cylinder, tiller steered runabout which sold for $750, that was very similar to his Times-Herald car.

With very few cars selling, creditors closed Hertel's factory in November 1900.

References

Defunct motor vehicle manufacturers of the United States
Motor vehicle manufacturers based in Massachusetts
Veteran vehicles
1890s cars
1900s cars
Vehicle manufacturing companies established in 1899
Vehicle manufacturing companies disestablished in 1900
Cars introduced in 1899